Andrew Morris, Mayor of Galway, September 1588 to September 1589.

Morris had served as a bailiff for Galway Corporation in 1565. His single term of office occurred during the Spanish Armada. Some two hundred Spanish sailors were imprisoned in the town by June 1589. In the same month arrived Sir William FitzWilliam. On his orders all were beheaded. Only two are said to have survived, been given shelter within the town. The Pope is later said to have sent forgiveness to the town for the deed.

Andrew Morris died in 1594. His descendants include Baron Killanin and John Ford.

References
 History of Galway, James Hardiman, Galway, 1820.
 Old Galway, Maureen Donovan O'Sullivan, 1942.
 Henry, William (2002). Role of Honour: The Mayors of Galway City 1485–2001. Galway: Galway City Council.  
 Martyn, Adrian, The Tribes of Galway:1124–1642, Galway, 2016. 

Mayors of Galway
1594 deaths
Year of birth missing
16th-century births
16th-century Irish politicians
People of Elizabethan Ireland